Osterberger is a surname. Notable people with the surname include:

André Osterberger (1920–2009), French hammer thrower
Eugenia Osterberger (1852–1932), Spanish pianist and composer
Kenneth Osterberger (1930–2016), American politician